Turkish Airlines (Turkish: Türk Hava Yolları) is the national flag carrier airline of Turkey.  , it operates scheduled services to 340 destinations in Europe, Asia, Africa, and the Americas, making it the largest mainline carrier in the world by number of passenger destinations. The airline serves more destinations non-stop from a single airport than any other airline in the world and flies to 126 countries, more than any other airline. With an operational fleet of 24 cargo aircraft, the airline's cargo division Turkish Cargo serves 82 destinations.

The airline's corporate headquarters are at the Turkish Airlines General Management Building on the grounds of Istanbul Atatürk Airport in Yeşilköy, Bakırköy, Istanbul. Istanbul Airport in Arnavutköy is the airline's main base, and there are secondary hubs at Ankara Esenboğa Airport and Izmir Adnan Menderes Airport. Turkish Airlines has been a member of the Star Alliance network since 1 April 2008.

History

Early years
Turkish Airlines was established on 20 May 1933 as Turkish State Airlines (Turkish: Devlet Hava Yolları) as a department of the Ministry of National Defense. The airline's initial fleet consisted of two five-seat Curtiss Kingbirds, two four-seat Junkers F 13s and one ten-seat Tupolev ANT-9. In 1935, the airline was turned over to the Ministry of Public Works and was subsequently renamed General Directorate of State Airlines. Three years later, in 1938, it became part of the Ministry of Transportation.

Postwar period

Several Douglas DC-3s and Douglas C-47s were phased in during 1945. Being initially set up as a domestic carrier, the airline commenced international services with the inauguration of Ankara–Istanbul–Athens flights in 1947; with the DC-3s and C-47s enabling the carrier to expand its network.

Nicosia, Beirut and Cairo were soon added to the airline's international flight destinations. However, domestic services remained the carrier's primary focus until the early 1960s.

In 1956, the Turkish government reorganized the airline under the name Türk Hava Yolları A.O. (often abbreviated as THY). It was capitalized at TRY 60 million. The airline joined the International Air Transport Association (IATA) shortly thereafter. In 1957, British Overseas Airways Corporation (BOAC) began supplying technical support after acquiring a 6.5 percent shareholding, which it held for about 20 years.

New aircraft including Vickers Viscounts, Fokker F27s and Douglas DC-3s were added to the fleet in the late 1950s and early 1960s. Turkish Airlines began operating their first jet, a McDonnell Douglas DC-9, in 1967. This was followed by the addition of three Boeing 707 jets in 1971. Other aircraft operated in the early 1970s included the McDonnell Douglas DC-10 and the Fokker F28 which were put into service in 1972 and 1973 respectively.

1980s and 1990s

The airline was plagued by several issues in the 1980s and 90s. It developed a reputation for poor service compared to competitors and flight delays, with 47 out of 100 flights not departing on time. It also endured hijackings and suffered seven accidents between 1974 and 1983. The most notorious was the 1974 crash of Turkish Airlines Flight 981, when an aircraft design flaw led to a faulty cargo door breaking off in flight near Ermenonville, France, resulting in the deaths of 346 people.

A new government came to power in 1983 which recognized THY's importance as Turkey's gateway to the world, beginning the airline's makeover into a modern operation. It would go on to maintain one of the youngest fleets in the world. Security was intensified, causing one shipper to compare it to Israel's El Al, at least in terms of delays.

THY built a new, state-of-the-art technical center at Yeşilköy Airport in 1984. The airline was capable of both light and heavy maintenance on many different aircraft types. The technical staff then made up one-quarter of the airline's 6,000 employees, according to Air Transport World. In 1984, the company's capital was raised to 60 billion TL as it was classified as a state economic enterprise. Three years later, the capital was raised again, to 150 billion TL.

By the mid-1980s, THY had a fleet of 30 aircraft. It was flying approximately three million passengers a year to 16 domestic destinations and three dozen international ones. The airline was Turkey's largest source of foreign currency. Turkish Airlines began operating Airbus A310s in 1985, allowing the addition of flights to Singapore in 1986. A route to New York City via Brussels was added in 1987.

The company posted losses in 1987 and 1988, largely due to high payments on its dozen new Airbus A310s, according to Air Transport World. The fleet also included 11 Boeing 727s and nine Douglas DC-9s. THY ended the decade with 8,500 employees.

The airline ordered five Airbus A340 aircraft with option for five more in 1990 to be able to fly to North American and East Asian destinations non-stop. The first A340 was delivered three years later, in 1993.

The company suffered in the global aviation crisis following the Persian Gulf War and would not break-even again until 1994. However, the business was again booming in the mid-1990s, with the greatest growth coming from North American destinations.  THY launched a nonstop flight to New York City in July 1994.

The company's capital continued to be raised, reaching 10 trillion TL in 1995. During that year, the airline also converted three of its Boeing 727s to dedicated freighters. The DC-9s had been sold off. The company posted a $6 million profit on revenues of $1 billion for the year. While profitable, THY had to contend with Turkey's exorbitant inflation, making capital improvements difficult.

The domestic market was deregulated in 1996, allowing new scheduled competition from charter airlines. At the same time, larger international carriers were providing stiff competition on routes to Western Europe. THY entered into marketing agreements with other international airlines to enhance their competitiveness. The company teamed with Japan Airlines to offer service to Osaka and Tokyo in 1997 and 1998. Other jointly operated flights soon followed with Austrian Airlines, Swissair, and Croatia Airlines. In 1997, THY began to operate flights to Chicago as second destination in the US.

21st century

A new terminal opened in January 2000 at Istanbul's Istanbul Atatürk Airport. Turkish Airlines continued to extend their international reach, forging marketing agreements with Asiana Airlines, American Airlines, Malaysia Airlines, LOT Polish Airlines, Czech Airlines and Cathay Pacific in 2000. On 29 October 2000, THY withdrew from the Swissair-led Qualiflyer alliance to help attract a strategic investor for their privatization. The airline had been part of the alliance's frequent-flyer program since November 1998. An Antalya-Frankfurt route was added in 2001 through a code-sharing agreement with Sun Express.

Turkey underwent an economic crisis throughout most of 2001, leading to a reduction in traffic on domestic routes in particular. THY managed to survive after the September 11 attacks on the United States without a government bailout or mass layoffs, although 300 middle management positions were eliminated, 400 part-timers were laid off and wages were cut 10 percent. Turkish Daily News credited the airline's survival to entrepreneurial management, which was quick to get rid of loss-making routes at home and abroad.

In 2003, the war in Iraq prompted Turkish Airlines to close some routes in the Persian Gulf, while flights to Asia were suspended during the SARS epidemic. However, the airline soon recovered, increasing traffic on existing routes and adding service to Delhi after an 11-year lapse.

Another fleet expansion program kicked off in 2004, helping THY maintain one of the youngest fleets in Europe. In July that year, the airline announced a massive $2.8 billion order of 36 jets from Airbus, plus an order for 15 Boeing 737s.

THY was not just ordering new planes. It was planning to spend $350 million on a new technical and training facility at Istanbul's underutilized Sabiha Gökçen International Airport. The airline had built up a significant technical services operation, maintaining not just their aircraft but those of third parties. Turkish Technic employed 2,700 workers and was planning to hire another 2,000 by 2010. THY also had three flight simulators and offered flight training services.

The airline faced the entry of new competitors into the liberalizing Turkish aviation market. However, tourism was booming, with 20 million people expected to visit the country in 2005 versus 12 million in 2003. THY divested its 50% holding in Cyprus Turkish Airlines (Kıbrıs Türk Hava Yolları) in 2005.

Although the company was publicly traded at this time, the government-owned 98% of its shares. The privatization program was revived in 2004 with a public offering of 20% of shares on the Istanbul Stock Exchange. The Turkish government-owned 75% of shares after the offering, which raised $170 million. Currently, the Republic of Turkey's Prime Ministry Privatization Administration owns a 49.12% interest in THY, while 50.88% of shares are publicly traded.

On 1 April 2008, Turkish Airlines joined the Star Alliance after an 18-month integration process beginning in December 2006, becoming the seventh European airline in the 20-member alliance.

In December 2011, the Turkish government unveiled plans to modernize the Aden Adde International Airport in Mogadishu, Somalia, which became one of the newest flight destinations of the carrier in 2012. The rehabilitation project is part of Turkey's broader engagement in the local post-conflict reconstruction process. Among the scheduled renovations are new airport systems and infrastructure, including a modern control tower to monitor the airspace. In March 2012, Turkish Airlines became the first international carrier to resume flights to Somalia since the start of that country's civil war in the early 1990s.

By the end of 2013, Turkish Airlines had increased their number of flight points to 241 destinations worldwide (199 international and 42 domestic).

In the wake of the 2016 Turkish coup d'état attempt, the Federal Aviation Administration temporarily banned flights between Turkey and the United States. This posed a particular problem for Turkish Airlines as a key component of the airline's strategy was to deliver one-stop journeys between the US and hard-to-reach destinations in Africa, the Middle East, and India. This ban was lifted on 18 July, and Turkish Airlines resumed flights to the U.S. on 19 July after a three-day disruption.

In August 2016, Turkish Airlines announced a profit collapse to a loss of 198 million Euros for the second quarter of 2016 while expecting an overall loss of 10 million passengers for 2016. The airline already announced significant reductions in operations for the upcoming 2016–2017 schedule period with frequency cuts to 45 European and 13 intercontinental routes. Turkish Airlines also announced an overall record loss of 1.9 billion Turkish Lira ($644.4 million) for the first half of 2016.

The following year saw the airline recover, with financial results for 2017 showing an almost 35% increase in turnover, and a return to profitability.

In February 2022, Turkish Cargo, the airline's freight subsidiary, relocated all cargo flights and operations from their former base at Istanbul Atatürk Airport to the new Istanbul Airport.

In February 2023, Turkish Airlines confirmed plans to spin-off AnadoluJet from an incorporated brand name into an independent airline.

Corporate affairs
The airline head office is in the Turkish Airlines General Management Building at Istanbul Atatürk Airport in Yeşilköy, Bakırköy.

Key people
On 26 January 2022, İlker Aycı resigned from his position as chairman of the airline. During the board meeting the next day, Ahmet Bolat was elected to become the new chairman. Bilal Ekşi holds the deputy chairman and CEO positions.

Business trends
The key trends for Turkish Airlines for the past 15 years are shown below (as of December 2018):

Destinations

, Turkish Airlines flies to 340 destinations in 129 countries, including 53 domestic and 12 in the United States.

Codeshare agreements
Turkish Airlines codeshares with the following airlines:

 Aegean Airlines
 Air Albania
 Air Algérie
 Air Astana
 Air Canada
 Air China
 Air Europa
 Air India
 Air Malta
 Air Moldova
 Air New Zealand
 Air Serbia
 All Nippon Airways
 AnadoluJet
 Asiana Airlines
 Avianca
 Azerbaijan Airlines
 Azul Brazilian Airlines
 Bangkok Airways
 Batik Air Malaysia
 Belavia
 Copa Airlines
 Croatia Airlines
 EgyptAir
 Ethiopian Airlines
 Etihad Airways
 EVA Air
 Finnair
 Garuda Indonesia
 Gol Linhas Aéreas Inteligentes
 Gulf Air
 Hawaiian Airlines
 Hong Kong Airlines
 IndiGo
 JetBlue
 Kuwait Airways
 LOT Polish Airlines
 Lufthansa
 Luxair
 Malaysia Airlines
 MIAT Mongolian Airlines
 Middle East Airlines
 Oman Air
 Pakistan International Airlines
 Philippine Airlines
 Royal Air Maroc
 Royal Brunei Airlines
 Royal Jordanian
 RwandAir
 Scandinavian Airlines
 Singapore Airlines
 TAP Air Portugal
 TAROM
 Thai Airways
 Ukraine International Airlines
 United Airlines
 Utair
 Uzbekistan Airways

Interline agreements
Turkish Airlines has interline agreements with the following airlines:

 Austrian Airlines
 Loganair
 Swiss International Air Lines

Fleet 

 Turkish Airlines operates a fleet of 400 aircraft, consisting of 13 passenger aircraft types. The airline started operations in 1933 with five aircraft, which grew to 52 in 1945 after the addition of Douglas DC-3s used in the Second World War. This made Turkish Airlines the largest carrier in the Middle East. The first jet-engined aircraft of the airline was a Douglas DC-9, which joined the fleet in 1967. The first wide-body Douglas DC-10 was added in 1972. The airline made major changes to its fleet development in late-1980s, when the first Airbus A310 arrived, and the Airbus A340 was ordered. The first Boeing 737s arrived a few years later.

Throughout 2004, the airline ordered over 50 aircraft both from Boeing and Airbus. Three Boeing 777-300s were leased in 2008, and later ordered 12 more from Boeing. In 2013, the airline ordered almost 200 aircraft. The airline ordered 25 each of the Boeing 787-9 and Airbus A350-900 in March 2018, which started delivery in 2019 and 2020 respectively.

Frequent-flyer programme

Miles & Smiles is the frequent-flyer programme of Turkish Airlines, inaugurated in 2000 after the airline left Qualiflyer. Earned miles can be used on Turkish Airlines flights, as well as on flights operated by the entire Star Alliance network. Miles&Smiles Classic Plus members are entitled to Star Alliance Silver benefits, while Elite and Elite Plus Miles & Smiles status entitles the member to Star Alliance Gold benefits.

Miles & Smiles Credit Card 
Members of the frequent flyer programme also earn miles when paying their purchases with their Miles & Smiles credit card. Currently residents of Turkey, Israel and Azerbaijan are offered with Miles & Smiles credit card by programme member local banks. Credit cards can be issued in form of American Express, Mastercard and/or Isracard. There are also agreements with specific banks in countries across America, Asia and Oceania for earning and spending miles.

Turkish Airlines Corporate Club 
Turkish Airlines Corporate Club is a kind of programme created for corporates. The Club allows its members to easily arrange business travels with special benefits. The Corporate Club is a part of Universal Air Travel Plan Network (UATP).

Sponsorship and promotion agreements
 
Turkish Airlines has been the official carrier of several European football clubs such as Galatasaray, Manchester United, FC Barcelona, Borussia Dortmund, Olympique de Marseille, Aston Villa, FK Sarajevo, and Hannover 96.

The airline has also made sponsorship and promotion deals with renowned athletes and actors, including Lionel Messi, Kobe Bryant, Caroline Wozniacki, Kevin Costner, Wayne Rooney, and Didier Drogba.

The company has been the primary sponsor of the Turkish Airlines EuroLeague since 2010 and was among the sponsors of the 2010 FIBA World Championship.

On 22 October 2013, Turkish Airlines and Euroleague signed an agreement to prolong their existing sponsorship deal by five years until 2020.

Turkish Airlines is the sponsor of the Turkish Airlines Open, a European Tour golf tournament played annually in Turkey since 2013.

Turkish Airlines was the kit sponsor of Galatasaray for the 2014–15 UEFA Champions League and Bosnian club FK Sarajevo. Since then, the airline has continued its sponsorship of Galatasaray and has also been the kit sponsor for the European campaigns of other Turkish clubs such as Trabzonspor and Başakşehir.

On 10 December 2015, Turkish Airlines and UEFA signed a sponsorship deal for the UEFA Euro 2016, becoming the first airline sponsor of UEFA European Championship tournaments.

On 29 January 2016, Turkish Airlines announced its partnership with Warner Bros. to sponsor the film Batman v Superman: Dawn of Justice. In the movie, a pivotal scene unfolds aboard a Turkish Airlines A330. That year, the airline also teamed up with a number of Turkish tourist agencies in the production of the romantic comedy film Non-Transferable.

On 14 September 2018, Turkish Airlines and Lega Basket Serie A, the top-tier professional basketball league in Italy, signed a sponsorship agreement, making the airline an official partner for the 2018–19 LBA season.

In February 2019, Turkish Airlines arranged to become partial sponsors for League of Ireland First Division side Drogheda United.

In August 2019, Turkish Airlines reached an agreement with Club Atlético River Plate to become the main sponsor of the Argentine sports club for the next three seasons.

Prior to the start of the 2022–23 season, Turkish Airlines becomes the official global sponsors of the UEFA Champions League and the Super Cup, UEFA Youth League and the Futsal Champions League for the remainder of the 2021–24 cycle after UEFA agreed to sponsor in the next 2 seasons.

Turkish Airlines Flight Academy

Turkish Airlines Flight Academy (TAFA) was established by the 28th THY Board on 10 November 2004, and started training with 16 cadets on 1 May 2006. The Flight Academy is based at Istanbul Atatürk Airport and uses Aydın Çıldır Airport for training activities.

The ever-growing flight academy fleet consists of the following 25 aircraft, 19 of which are single-engine and 6 of which are multi-engine aircraft:

 13 Cessna 172S NAVIII
  6 Diamond DA-40
 6 Diamond DA-42 NG

Turkish Airlines Maintenance Center

Turkish Airlines' maintenance, repair and overhaul (MRO) center, Turkish Technic, was incorporated in 2006 and is responsible for the maintenance of Turkish Airlines and other third party aircraft within eight hangars. Capabilities include airframe, landing gear, APU and other subsystems. Turkish Technic opened an engine center in partnership with Pratt & Whitney called TEC (Turkish Engine Center) in January 2010 at Sabiha Gökçen International Airport (SAW). The facility provides engine MRO services to customers worldwide.

Turkish Technic was based at Istanbul Atatürk Airport within two hangars. It bought out MNG Technic along with its hangars, and the main complex moved to SAW with the building of two new hangars. Two smaller hangars are also located at Ankara Esenboğa Airport. Additional hangars are being built at the new Istanbul Airport to accommodate the operator's growing fleet.

Incidents and accidents
In its history, Turkish Airlines has suffered a total of 19 incidents and accidents of which 15 were fatal. A total of 68 crew, 835 passengers and 35 people on the ground have been killed.

 On 17 February 1959, a Vickers Viscount Type 793, registration TC-SEV, operating a charter flight carrying Turkish Prime Minister Adnan Menderes and a governmental delegation to London for the signing of the London-Zürich Agreements, crashed in dense fog on approach to London Gatwick Airport. Nine of the sixteen passengers and five of the eight crew lost their lives. Adnan Menderes, who was sitting in the back part of the aircraft, survived the accident.
 On 23 September 1961, Turkish Airlines Flight 835, a Fokker F27-100 registered as TC-TAY, crashed at Karanlıktepe in Ankara Province on approach to Esenboğa Airport. All of the 4 crew and 24 of the 25 passengers on board were killed.
 On 8 March 1962, a Fairchild F-27, registration TC-KOP, crashed into the Taurus Mountains on approach to Adana Şakirpaşa Airport. All three crew and all eight passengers on board died.
 On 3 February 1964, a Douglas C-47, registered as TC-ETI, on a domestic cargo flight, flew into terrain whilst on approach to Esenboğa Airport, Ankara. All three crew members on board were killed.
 On 2 February 1969, a Vickers Viscount Type 794, registered as TC-SET, crashed on approach to Esenboğa Airport. There were no casualties.
 On 26 January 1974, Turkish Airlines Flight 301, a Fokker F28-1000 registered as TC-JAO crashed shortly after takeoff from Izmir Cumaovası Airport due to atmospheric icing on the wings. The aircraft disintegrated and caught fire, killing 4 of the 5 crew and 62 of the 68 passengers on board.
 On 3 March 1974, Turkish Airlines Flight 981, a McDonnell Douglas DC-10 registered as TC-JAV, crashed into Ermenonville Forest, Fontaine-Chaalis, Oise, France due to explosive decompression, killing all 335 passengers and 11 crew on board. The main cause was a design fault on the cargo doors of the McDonnell Douglas DC-10 which led to incomplete engagement of the door locking mechanism on the aircraft in question, and consequent opening of one door in flight.
 On 30 January 1975, Turkish Airlines Flight 345, a Fokker F28-1000 registration TC-JAP, crashed into the Sea of Marmara during final approach to Istanbul Yeşilköy Airport. All 4 crew and all 38 passengers on board the aircraft were killed.
 On 19 September 1976, a Boeing 727-200 registered as TC-JBH operating Turkish Airlines Flight 452 from Istanbul Yeşilköy Airport to Antalya Airport struck high ground in the Karatepe Mountains during an attempted landing in Isparta instead of Antalya by pilot error. All eight crew and 146 people on board the aircraft perished in the accident.
Three of the four crew and 38 of the 41 passengers on board were killed.
 On 16 January 1983, Turkish Airlines Flight 158, a Boeing 727-200 registered as TC-JBR, landed about 50 m (160 ft) short of the runway at Esenboğa Airport in driving snow, broke up and caught fire. All of the 7 crew survived; however, of the 60 passengers on board, 47 were killed.
 On 29 December 1994, Turkish Airlines Flight 278, a Boeing 737-400 registration TC-JES, crashed during its final approach to Van Ferit Melen Airport in driving snow. Five of the seven crew and 52 of the 69 passengers died.
 On 7 April 1999, Turkish Airlines Flight 5904, a Boeing 737-400 registered as TC-JEP on a repositioning flight, crashed near Ceyhan, Adana shortly after taking off from Adana Şakirpaşa Airport. There were no passengers on board, but all six crew members perished in the accident.
 On 8 January 2003, Turkish Airlines Flight 634, an Avro RJ-100 registration TC-THG, crashed on approach to Diyarbakır Airport, Turkey. Of the 80 people on board, all five crew and 70 passengers were killed.
 On 3 October 2006, Turkish Airlines Flight 1476 en route from Tirana, Albania to Istanbul was hijacked by Turkish citizen Hakan Ekinci in Greek airspace. The hijacker surrendered after a forced landing in Brindisi, Italy.
 On 25 February 2009, Turkish Airlines Flight 1951, a Boeing 737-800 registered as TC-JGE carrying 128 passengers and a crew of 7, crashed during final approach to Amsterdam Airport Schiphol, Netherlands. It was determined that a faulty radar altimeter caused the aircraft to throttle the engines back to idle and that the crew subsequently failed to react properly which resulted in an unrecoverable stall and the subsequent crash. Of the 135 people on board, nine people, including the three pilots, were killed. Eighty-six more people were transported to local hospitals.
 On 3 March 2015, Turkish Airlines Flight 726 departed the runway on landing at Tribhuvan International Airport, Kathmandu, Nepal. The Airbus A330-300 operating the flight, TC-JOC, was severely damaged when its nose gear collapsed, causing damage to the fuselage and both wings. All 227 passengers and 11 crew members on board escaped uninjured.
 On 25 April 2015, Turkish Airlines Flight 1878, an Airbus A320-200 TC-JPE was severely damaged in a landing accident at Istanbul Atatürk Airport. All on board were successfully evacuated without any injuries reported.
 On 16 January 2017, Turkish Airlines Flight 6491, a Boeing 747-412F operated for Turkish Airlines under wet lease from ACT Airlines, crashed into a residential area upon attempting landing in Manas International Airport in Bishkek, Kyrgyzstan, killing all four crew members and 35 people on the ground. In response, Turkish Airlines released a statement on Twitter that neither plane nor crew were theirs, calling it an "ACT Airlines accident". However, the flight was still operated under a Turkish Airlines flight number, making it a Turkish Airlines flight under IATA rules.
 On 21 November 2019, Turkish Airlines Flight 467, a Boeing 737-800, suffered a nose gear collapse while attempting to land in heavy crosswinds at Odesa International Airport in Ukraine. All passengers and crew were deplaned using emergency slides without injury.

See also
 List of airlines of Turkey
 Aviation in Turkey

References

Citations

Bibliography

External links 

 
 Skylife 
 Anadolujet (Regional low-cost carrier of THY)
 SunExpress (Joint venture with Lufthansa)
 Turkish Technic Official website
 Turkish Aviation Academy Official website

 
Turkish brands
Airlines of Turkey
Airlines established in 1933
Association of European Airlines members
Companies listed on the Istanbul Stock Exchange
Companies based in Istanbul
Star Alliance
Turkish companies established in 1933